John L. McElligott (born 1958) is an Irish retired Gaelic footballer. His league and championship career with the Kerry senior team spanned eight seasons from 1979 to 1985.

McElliigott made his debut on the inter-county scene at the age of seventeen when he was selected for the Kerry minor team in 1976. He had one championship season with the minor team in which he was a Munster Minor Football Championship runner-up. McElligott subsequently joined the Kerry under-21 team, culminating as an All-Ireland runner-up in 1978. He later joined the Kerry senior team after being added to the panel for the 1979 championship. Over the course of the next eight seasons, McElligott won one All-Ireland medal. He also won two Munster medals and two National Football League medals. He played his last game for Kerry in October 1985.

Honours

Austin Stacks
All-Ireland Senior Club Football Championship (1): 1977
Munster Senior Club Football Championship (1): 1976
Kerry Senior Football Championship (3): 1976, 1979, 1986

Kerry
All-Ireland Senior Football Championship (1): 1979
Munster Senior Football Championship (2): 1979, 1982
 National Football League (2): 1981-82, 1983-84
Munster Under-21 Football Championship (1): 1978

References

1958 births
Living people
Austin Stacks Gaelic footballers
Kerry inter-county Gaelic footballers